Eddie Joseph Kennison, III (born January 20, 1973) is a former American football wide receiver. He played college football at Louisiana State University and was drafted by the St. Louis Rams in the first round of the 1996 NFL Draft. Kennison also played for the New Orleans Saints, Chicago Bears, Denver Broncos and Kansas City Chiefs.

Early years
Kennison attended Washington-Marion High School in Lake Charles, Louisiana, and was a star in both football and track. In football, as a senior, he was a Parade All-American despite playing only six games. He finished his senior year with 27 receptions for 497 yards (18.4 yards per reception avg.). As a junior, he hauled in 59 receptions for 1,205 yards (an average of 20.4 yards per reception) and 23 touchdowns. For his efforts, he was the first person in his school's history to have his number retired.

College career
Kennison was a noted sprinter in college, where he was a six-time All-America selection.  He led the LSU Tigers track and field 4x100-meter relay team to the 1994 NCAA Outdoor Championship, and also qualified for the NCAA Championships in the 4x100, 4x200, 4x400 and the 200 meters during his time at LSU.

Professional career

Pre-draft
At his LSU Pro Day Kennison ran the 40-yard dash in 4.28 seconds and 4.32 seconds. He scored a 12 on the wonderlic test at the 1996 NFL Combine and measured 6-0½ and weighed 191 pounds.

First stint with Rams
Kennison was selected 18th overall by the St. Louis Rams in the 1996 NFL Draft, a draft which was remarkably deep in wide receivers.  On July 30, 1996, Kennison signed a four-year, $6 million deal with a $2 million signing bonus. His first season with the Rams was excellent, as he finished second to Terry Glenn in yards and receptions for rookies, and led the rookie wide receiver class in touchdowns. It was noted regularly at the time that Kennison and Glenn had outproduced number one overall pick Keyshawn Johnson. He also was selected as an alternate to the Pro Bowl. His 1997 and 1998 seasons with the Rams were far less productive, as he battled nagging injuries in a lackluster Rams offense.

New Orleans Saints
On February 18, 1999, Kennison was traded to the New Orleans Saints for a second-round draft pick in the 1999 NFL Draft. Saints coach Mike Ditka said, "Our goal as coaches is to get Eddie back to the form he displayed as a rookie". In 1999 he led the team in receptions and yards.  This Saints team used four different starting quarterbacks over the course of the year as they struggled to a 3–13 record.

Chicago Bears
On February 22, 2000, the Saints traded Kennison to the Chicago Bears for a fifth-round pick in the 2000 NFL Draft. "(Kennison) gives us another speed guy, and that's something you can't have enough of", his new coach said. With the Bears he continued a pattern of unspectacular but reliable production. He finished second on the team to Marcus Robinson in receiving yards, and tied Robinson for the team lead in receptions. His salary for the 2000 season was $1.02 million.

Denver Broncos
On April 5, 2001, Kennison signed a two-year, $1.8 million deal with the Denver Broncos that included a $500,000 signing bonus. Kennison was on the depth chart behind starters Rod Smith and Ed McCaffrey, but an early-season injury to McCaffrey meant that Kennison was thrust into a starting role. After eight unproductive games, Kennison requested to be released from the team the night before a game in which he was scheduled to start. He stated at the time he had "lost his love for the game". Kennison’s decision was reportedly due to his wife’s complicated pregnancy and his father’s heart attack.
As a result Kennison retired at the age of 28 and was released on November 15, 2001. The loss of Kennison, along with injuries to other Broncos receivers, decimated a once dominant Broncos corps of wide receivers.

Kansas City Chiefs
Kennison unexpectedly resurfaced less than a month later, signing with the Broncos' arch-rival Kansas City Chiefs on December 3, 2001, to the outrage of Broncos coach Mike Shanahan. Kennison's new contract was for two-years and $4.5 million with $3.2 guaranteed. Kennison would lead the Chiefs in receiving his first game as a starter.

On January 3, 2003, Kennison signed a six-year $9 million contract extension with the Chiefs.
As a member of the Chiefs, from 2002 to 2006 Kennison averaged 59 receptions, 961 yards, and 5 touchdown catches during this span.

In 2007, Kennison sustained a severe hamstring injury on the first play of the regular season, and was plagued by the injury for the remainder of the season. He was released the following offseason on February 26, 2008.

Later career and retirement
Kennison was re-signed by the Rams on September 9, 2008. 
Kennison was released by the Rams on October 7, then signed again just hours later. He was released again on October 22.

Kennison signed a one day ceremonial contract with the Chiefs on July 19, 2010 so he could retire as a member of the team.

NFL career statistics

References

1973 births
Living people
American football wide receivers
Chicago Bears players
Denver Broncos players
Kansas City Chiefs players
LSU Tigers football players
LSU Tigers track and field athletes
New Orleans Saints players
St. Louis Rams players
Sportspeople from Lake Charles, Louisiana
Players of American football from Louisiana
Ed Block Courage Award recipients